Zwischenwasser is a municipality in the district of Feldkirch in the Austrian state of Vorarlberg.

Zwischenwasser has three districts: Muntlix (the largest), Batschuns and Dafins.

Population

References

Cities and towns in Feldkirch District
Bregenz Forest Mountains